Republic road I-4 is a major road in Northern Bulgaria. I-4 road is planned to be superseded by Hemus motorway (A2).

References

External links
Road network of Bulgaria RIA

Roads in Bulgaria